Richard Sedlon (1900–1992) was an American painter from Bedford, Ohio.

Life
Richard Carl Sedlon was born on August 26, 1900, in the bohemian section of Philadelphia, Pennsylvania. The second son of Vincent and Hortense Sedlon, Richard found his artistic calling early in life and by eighteen was already a journeyman lithographer with Morgan Lithography in Cleveland, Ohio. Sedlon was also a professional artist who dabbled in carvings, oil paintings and sketches. He was locally renowned and lived in Bedford, Ohio in the Hezekiah Dunham House with his wife Anne Nyerges, until his death on 9 February 1992. He is buried in Bedford, Ohio.

Photo gallery

External links
 Richard Sedlon at Ancestry.com
Bedford Historical Society, Bedford, Ohio
Sample and sample of Richard Sedlon art.

1900 births
1992 deaths
20th-century American painters
American male painters
American lithographers
20th-century American printmakers
20th-century American male artists
20th-century lithographers